Irakli Garibashvili (also transliterated as Gharibashvili; born 28 June 1982) is a Georgian politician and a former business executive who has served as the prime minister of Georgia since 22 February 2021. He previously served as prime minister from 20 November 2013 until his resignation on 30 December 2015. Garibashvili is a member of the Georgian Dream party. He entered politics with his long-time associate Bidzina Ivanishvili, in October 2012.

He served as Defence Minister of Georgia in the cabinet of prime minister Giorgi Gakharia from 2019 to 2021 and, prior to that, as Minister of Internal Affairs in the cabinet of Bidzina Ivanishvili from 2012 to 2013. Ivanishvili named Garibashvili as his successor as prime minister when he voluntarily stepped down in November 2013. Aged 31 at his ascension, he was the youngest person to assume the Prime Ministerial office. During his first term, he was the second youngest state leader in the world, after Kim Jong-un.

Early career
From 1988 to 1999 Garibashvili attended the secondary school No. 1 in Dedoplistsqaro. From 1999 to 2005 Garibashvili studied International Relations at Tbilisi State University (TSU), where he graduated with a master's degree. He also studied at the Pantheon-Sorbonne University from 2002 to 2004. Since 2004, he has worked with the multi-billionaire Bidzina Ivanishvili. He started by working for logistics division of the construction company Burji, owned by Ivanshvili's Cartu Group. He became Director General of Ivanishvili's charity foundation Cartu in 2005, a member of the supervisory board of Ivanishvili's Cartu Bank in 2007 and director of the label Georgian Dream founded by Ivanishvili's pop-star son Bera in 2009.

Early political career

Garibashvili became involved in the politics of Georgia when Ivanishvili founded his political party Georgian Dream–Democratic Georgia in February 2012. Garibashvili was one of the founding members and initially headed the party's revision committee. He was included in the party list of MP candidates for the October 2012 parliamentary election. After the coalition won the 2012 parliamentary election on 1 October, Irakli Garibashvili became a party-list representative of the Georgian Dream – Democratic Georgia party in the 2012 convocation of the Parliament of Georgia.

Minister of Internal Affairs
After Georgian Dream's victory in the 2012 parliamentary election, Garibashvili was appointed as Minister of Internal Affairs in the cabinet of prime minister Ivanishvili on 25 October 2012. Garibashvili, then 30 years old, became the youngest member of Georgia's new government. Reforming the Interior Ministry, an agency overseeing Georgian police, security and intelligence services, as well as the border guard and navy, was a part of the Georgian Dream's pre-election agenda.

Georgian Dream also promised to "restore justice" during the election campaign and to prosecute officials of the previous government for human rights abuses committed while in office, especially after the Gldani prison scandal prior to the elections confirmed long-standing allegations of ill-treatment in the Georgian penitentiary system. Subsequently, from 2012 through 2013, the Interior Ministry arrested several high-ranking officials from the previous government, including the former ministers Bachana Akhalaia and Ivane Merabishvili. 

During his tenure, Garibashvili announced that he would take steps to de-politicise the Ministry of Internal Affairs. As part of the reform, the Constitutional Security and Special Operative Departments were abolished. An ad hoc commission was set up to handle 24 000 illegal surveillance files found in the MIA. Those files, which contained compromising footage, were destroyed in presence of media and members of a commission in August 2013. 

Garibashvili's agency faced the post-election spike in crime in Georgia after the newly elected government granted large-scale prison amnesty to reduce Georgia's high incarceration rate. Garibashvili opposed the amnesty project, but it was implemented by the parliament anyway. 

Garibashvili defended the arrests of the former ministers as being in strict accordance with the law and justice and claimed that the rate of minor crime, albeit increased, was not alarming.

First Premiership

On 2 November 2013, prime minister Bidzina Ivanishvili, who had declared his intention to quit the government following the October 2013 presidential election, named Garibashvili as his successor. He and his cabinet won in a vote of 93-19 in the Parliament of Georgia on 20 November 2013. Garibashvili thus occupied the most powerful political office in the country as the constitution amendments had transferred power from the president to the prime minister and the government. At heated parliamentary debates with the United National Movement minority during the vote, Garibashvili promised economic improvement and stressed that Georgia's EU and NATO aspiration would remain his foreign priorities.

On 24 November 2013, he was elected chairman of the Georgian Dream–Democratic Georgia party, succeeding Ivanishvili. Garibashvili announced his resignation on 23 December 2015. While no reason was given for the sudden move, it was reported that he may have done so due to low levels of support for the Georgian Dream among the populace, with it polling at 18% in November, and parliamentary elections scheduled for 2016. Opposition politicians, analysts and media speculated that falling support for the ruling Georgian Dream coalition, pressure from the previous prime minister Bidzina Ivanishvili, or tensions with the president Giorgi Margvelashvili were possible explanations for Garibashvili's resignation. Garibashvili was succeeded as prime minister by Giorgi Kvirikashvili, who had been his Minister of Foreign Affairs, with the transfer of power taking effect on 29 December.

Government initiatives
During his tenure the Security and Crisis Management Council was established, as stipulated by the new Constitution of Georgia. In addition, the Unified Coordination Center for Crisis Management was created, with technical assistance from the US, the United Kingdom and Israel. To coordinate the country's economic policy, Irakli Garibashvili established the Economic Council.

Human rights
The Georgian Government initiated, and the European Union directly supported, the development of the Human Rights Strategy and Action Plan. A relevant statement was made by prime minister Garibashvili at the Human Rights Conference, on 4 December 2013. The Human Rights Strategy covers seven years and will not depend on the political cycle.

Foreign policy
During his tenure, Garibashvili visited the neighboring countries Armenia, Azerbaijan and Turkey, several European nations, the United States, Israel, the People's Republic of China, and participated in several international summits and forums. While relations to Russia improved, there was no state visits to and from Russia.

Relations to the European Union were a priority, culminating in the EU-Georgia Association Agreement, initiated at the Vilnius summit and signed on 27 June 2014. This association agreement included a deep and comprehensive free trade agreement between Georgia and the European Union and paved the way for the abolition of visa for travel from Georgia to the Schengen area, planned for 2017.

Return to private sector
In February 2018, Garibashvili became the regional adviser to the board of the CEFC China Energy company.

Second Premiership

Nika Melia, chairman of the United National Movement party, was accused of organizing mass violence during the anti-government protests in 2019. When Melia declined to pay a $12,000 bail, a Georgian court ruled that Melia should be detained before his trial. In response, prime minister Giorgi Gakharia said the court's ruling was "unlawful", and on 18 February, Gakharia resigned over the decision to detain Melia. Melia was arrested while at United National Movement party headquarters on 23 February. The ruling Georgian Dream party supported Garibashvili to replace Gakharia, and the Parliament voted 89–2 to appoint Garibashvili on 22 February.

As a result of the outbreak of the 2022 Russian invasion in Ukraine on 24 February 2022 and fears that Russia might once again invade Georgia as it did in 2008, on 3 March 2022, Prime Minister Garibashvili signed the letter with which the country officially applied for membership in the European Union (EU). The same day, Moldova (which experiences troubles regarding the Russian backed separatist state Transnistria) also signed its letter to officially apply for EU membership.

On March 7, 2023, the Georgian parliament passed a foreign agents law which would label any organization that has more than 20% of its profits be recorded from outside of Georgia as "agents of foreign influence." Garibashvili has been a leading figure in trying to get the bill passed stating that the bill meets "European and global standards". After parliament voted in favor of the bill, tens of thousands of protesters arrived at parliament and attempted to force their way in and where met with riot police, tear gas, and water canons.

Political positions

Garibashvili has been described as a conservative-leaning politician. On several occasions, most notably with the Gay Pride march, he backed the conservative side of the debate, adopting a majoritarian approach while noting that "95% of our population are against holding propagandistic parade in a demonstrative manner" so as an elected official he should follow that. Garibashvili added that Georgia "is a conservative society" and has unique values based on Orthodox Christianity, emphasizing that the minority should not decide fate of the majority. In 2014 he proposed to solidify the definition of marriage as union between a man and a woman in the Constitution of Georgia to balance the opposition from conservatives and Orthodox Church to the adoption of the Anti-Discrimination law, which was Georgia's precondition to get a visa free regime with the EU.

In his address to parliament in 2021, Gharibashvili criticized the idea of a minimal state and the "invisible hand of the market". He said that "small state idea is a myth impeding the country's development" and called on the government to play an active role in economy. Gharibashvili stated that "history does not know the precedent of development by allowing processes to flow on their own" and "neither Europe nor America developed in this way". Gharibashvili also emphasized that Georgia should become economically more self-sufficient.

Gharibashvili opposed mandatory vaccination against COVID-19, saying that Georgian citizens should enjoy "the right and an opportunity of free choice".

Personal life
Garibashvili is married to Nunuka Tamazashvili (born 1983), with three sons, Nikoloz (born 2005), Andria (born 2010), Gabriel (born 2015) and one daughter Nino (born 2016). His father-in-law, Tamaz Tamazashvili, is a former police general who was arrested on charges of illegally carrying and keeping weapon and explosives in October 2011. Garibashvili, a member of then-opposition Georgian Dream party, claimed the arrest was politically motivated. After the Georgian Dream acceded to power in October 2012, Tamazashvili was released from prison. In addition to Georgian, Garibashvili also speaks English, French and Russian.

Honours

On 23 August, 2021, President of Ukraine Volodymyr Zelensky awarded Garibashvili with the first degree order of merit during the Crimea Platform summit.

References

External links

 Official Website
 Irakli Gharibashvili on YouTube
 

1982 births
Living people
21st-century politicians from Georgia (country)
Businesspeople from Tbilisi
Expatriates from Georgia (country) in France
Georgian Dream politicians
Government ministers of Georgia (country)
Politicians from Tbilisi
Prime Ministers of Georgia
Tbilisi State University alumni
University of Paris alumni